8th National Assembly may refer to:

 8th National Assembly of France
 8th National Assembly of Laos
 8th National Assembly of Nigeria
 8th National Assembly of Pakistan
 8th National Assembly of Serbia
 8th National Assembly of Slovenia